This is a list of Croatian television related events from 1980.

Events

Debuts

Television shows
 Velo misto (1980–1981)

Ending this year

Births
14 March - Janko Popović Volarić, actor
31 August - Mario Valentić, actor
29 September - Marija Borić, actress
28 December - Mislav Čavajda, actor

Deaths